Shi Jinshuai (born 29 January 1999) is a Chinese footballer currently playing as a midfielder for Chinese club Hunan HBS Mangguoba.

Club career
Shi scored his first goal for Hunan Billows in 2021 against Xiamen Egret Island.

Career statistics

Club
.

References

1999 births
Living people
Sportspeople from Shijiazhuang
Footballers from Hebei
Chinese footballers
Chinese expatriate footballers
Association football midfielders
China League Two players
Villarreal CF players
Guangzhou F.C. players
Chinese expatriate sportspeople in Spain
Expatriate footballers in Spain